The  is an auto race held in Japan by the Japan Automobile Federation.

History
The original JAF Grand Prix was set up in year 1969 as to promoting Formula Car events in Japan, which was the highest ranked race other than the Japanese Grand Prix. The first race in 1969 was a Formula Libre event and was won by Australian driver Leo Geoghegan driving an ex-Jim Clark Lotus 39-Repco V8. The 1970 race was won by reigning Formula One World Champion Jackie Stewart driving a Brabham-Ford.

Then, after a brief suspension from 1971 to 1973 due to a scandal, it was held as a points-scoring round in Formula 2000, Formula Two, and Formula Pacific series until 1986. From 1988 to 1990, the JAF Grand Prix was a round of the All Japan Sports Prototype Championship. The JAF Grand Prix then went on hiatus for two decades.

In 2010, the JAF Grand Prix was revived by the JAF and named after its venue, Fuji Speedway, as the JAF Grand Prix and Fuji Sprint Cup. It served as a non-title season-ending race for the Formula Nippon and Super GT series. Teams which participated in five rounds in either series were eligible for their respective JAF Grand Prix events. The ruleset used in the Grand Prix differed from those used in regular-season Formula Nippon and Super GT events.

The JAF GP consisted of six separate races in 2010 and five races from 2011 to 2013; two each for Super GT's GT500 and GT300 classes, and one (two in 2010) for Formula Nippon. The race distance was about 100 km, less than half of the typical regular-season race distance. There were no mandated pit stops.
In 2010, qualifying results for the second Formula Nippon race were decided by top speed (measured at the end of the straight) rather than lap time. In 2011, grid positions were determined by a score based on top speed and lap time. Qualifying results for the 2012 and 2013 races were decided by lap times, as in the regular season.
In the Super GT races, the two drivers in every team drove in two separate races, instead of sharing a car in a single race as in the regular season.
As in the final round in the regular Super GT season, success ballast was not applied to Super GT participants. However, a standing start, instead of a rolling start, was used in JAF GP races.
Titles were awarded separately to Formula Nippon, GT500, and GT300 participants, depending on their overall results in their respective races.

In 2014, the non-championship Fuji Sprint Cup was discontinued. The JAF Grand Prix title now applies to the season-ending round of the Super Formula Championship held at Suzuka.

Winners of the JAF Grand Prix

Fuji Sprint Cup (2010–2013)

Group C events (1988–1990)

Formula events (1969–1990, 2014–2016)

Notes:
1. – The Grand Prix had been awarded for winners of two classes (Formula Two and Formula Pacific) per event from 1979 to 1982.
2. – Two events each were held in years 1978 and 1979.

External links

 JAF Grand Prix Fuji Sprint Cup official website 
 Japan Automobile Federation official website 
 former winners 

Auto races in Japan
Recurring sporting events established in 1969